Nord-Trøndelag Health Trust is a health trust that is subordinate to the Central Norway Regional Health Authority that operates the public specialist health care in Nord-Trøndelag county, Norway.

It includes the two hospitals Levanger Hospital and Namsos Hospital, the district psychiatric centres in Stjørdal and Kolvereid, and the patient transport system throughout the county.  The trust also has medical clinics in Stjørdal and Steinkjer.  The trust has about 2,500 employees and has about 200,000 patient contacts per year.

References

Health trusts of Norway
Hospitals established in 2002
Companies based in Levanger
2002 establishments in Norway